Michael Joel Zaslow (November 1, 1942 – December 6, 1998) was an  American actor. He was best known for his role as villain Roger Thorpe on CBS's Guiding Light, a role he played from 1971 to 1980 and again from 1989 to 1997, earning multiple nominationsand one winat the Daytime Emmy Awards.

Life and career
Zaslow was born in Inglewood, California. He played Dick Hart on the CBS soap opera Search for Tomorrow and Dr. Peter Chernak on Love Is a Many Splendored Thing.  He also played David Renaldi on ABC's One Life to Live from 1983 to 1986. 

Zaslow guest-starred on a number of other television shows and soap operas, including Barnaby Jones, The Love Boat, and Law & Order. In the episode "The Man Trap," the series' September 8, 1966 premiere of Star Trek, he played Crewman Darnell, the first Starship Enterprise crew member to be killed off. The incident sparked the first diagnosis of the now-famous line: "He's dead, Jim," by Enterprise crew-member Dr. Leonard McCoy (DeForest Kelley). He also appeared as Jordan in the episode "I, Mudd".  He costarred in the  1977 feature film You Light Up My Life, and appeared in the 1979 sci-fi movie Meteor.

Zaslow's Broadway theatre credits included Fiddler on the Roof, Cat on a Hot Tin Roof, and Onward Victoria.

Zaslow was also the godfather of actor Christian Slater.

However, it was for his work as Roger Thorpe on Guiding Light that Zaslow was always best known. One of the show's central villains of the 1970s, his first onscreen "death" was voted the top scene in the show's history when the series celebrated its 50th anniversary. In the late 1980s, he returned to the show and, once again, became a central figure. Zaslow received multiple Daytime Emmy nominations (and won once) for his work in the role, and continually appeared on both critics' and fans' lists of favorite soap opera performers.

Illness and death
In 1997, he began to experience difficulty speaking. When it became noticeable on screen, he was placed on leave at Guiding Light. (There are conflicting stories as to whether Zaslow was then fired; there was for some time a legal action against Guiding Light and sponsor Procter & Gamble, which was eventually settled.) It was some time before Zaslow was diagnosed with amyotrophic lateral sclerosis (ALS), or Lou Gehrig's disease (it was first thought he had suffered a stroke). Zaslow did not return to Guiding Light, and his role was briefly recast before being written off. (In 2004, Zaslow's character on Guiding Light died off-screen.)

Zaslow was hired at One Life to Live in 1998 to play David Renaldi again, appearing first in May of that year, his condition being written into the storyline. He made numerous appearances over the next seven months before he was too ill to continue working.

Zaslow died on December 6, 1998, at his New York City home. He was survived by his wife, psychologist/writer Susan Hufford; and two daughters, Helena and Marika.

His final appearance on One Life to Live was televised December 1. His character was never killed off on the soap opera, which went through a series of writers over a two-year period, none of whom chose to deal with Renaldi's illness or Zaslow's death.

Legacy
Hufford founded ZazAngels, a foundation that seeks to raise funds in order to find a cure for Lou Gehrig's disease. Several of Zaslow's Guiding Light and One Life to Live castmates, along with many Broadway-based theater luminaries, have participated in tributes that were fundraisers for ZazAngels. Hufford released a book about Zaslow and his fight with ALS, titled Not That Man Anymore. Zaslow had begun writing the book several years earlier.

Helena Zaslow died on December 28, 2004, in Connecticut at age 19, only days after completing her first semester at Wellesley College.

Hufford died from cancer on November 28, 2006.

Filmography

References

External links

1942 births
1998 deaths
20th-century American screenwriters
20th-century American male writers
Deaths from motor neuron disease
20th-century American male actors
American male film actors
American male television actors
American male soap opera actors
American soap opera writers
Daytime Emmy Award winners
Daytime Emmy Award for Outstanding Lead Actor in a Drama Series winners
American male television writers
Screenwriters from California
Male actors from Inglewood, California
Neurological disease deaths in New York (state)